The defending champions from 2011 were Michael Kohlmann and Alexander Peya, as there was no event in 2012. They chose not to participate.
Prakash Amritraj and Rajeev Ram defeated Purav Raja and Divij Sharan 7–6(7–1), 7–6(7–1) in the final to win the title.

Seeds

Draw

Draw

References
 Main Draw

Soweto Openandnbsp;- Men's Doubles
2013 Doubles